Not Another Happy Ending is a 2013 British romantic comedy film directed by John McKay, starring Karen Gillan, Stanley Weber and Freya Mavor. Produced by Claire Mundell and Wendy Griffin, and written by David Solomons, the film premiered at the Edinburgh International Film Festival on 30 June 2013. It was largely shot in Glasgow's Merchant City.

Plot
Scottish writer Jane Lockhart has received multiple rejection letters before Tom Duvall, the Franco-Scottish editor of a struggling publishing company, tells her he will publish her first novel. Overcome with happy surprise, she breaks out in tears. They develop a positive working relationship through the editing process, but she impulsively tells him she won't work with him after she completes her contracted second book, as he changed the title for her debut without her consent. The book is a success, the first big hit Tom has published, and Jane wins an award for best new writer. Willie Scott, the screenwriter who presented her with the award, flirts with her on stage and they end up becoming a couple. 

Towards the end of her second book, Jane suffers writer's block. She procrastinates, and she begins to imagine the protagonist of the book appearing at awkward moments. Tom is convinced she cannot write because she is excessively happy, inspired by his roommate's theory that great art comes from misery. He tries to make her feel bad to get her writing back on track but, in the process, realises he's in love with her.

After finally managing to read what she's written so far, Tom is elated, and the two almost kiss. They are interrupted when Jane receives a call from Willie, professing his love and proposing. However, on his return, the romance appears to have left their relationship. He takes her for granted, and they settle into a dull routine. He finishes writing his screenplay adaptation of her debut, but changes the ending, making it a happy one. Tom suggests he revert to the original ending of the book, but Willie refuses. Upon seeing the changes he's made, Jane leaves to finish the book alone in the countryside..

Tom follows her, with an apology and a suggestion to rewrite the ending. She makes him stay out in the cold until nightfall, but ultimately lets him in. After she blows up at him, they finally kiss, another inspirational wave hits her. The closing scene is in a cemetery, Jane is saying a few words over a casket. Suddenly it is announced by Tom that she will be signing copies of her new book, which they take from the casket. Taking her aside, he offers a new book contact, and they kiss.

Cast
 Karen Gillan as Jane Lockhart
 Stanley Weber as Tom Duvall
 Iain De Caestecker as Roddy
 Freya Mavor as Nicola Ball
 Amy Manson as Darsie
 Gary Lewis as Benny Lockhart
 Kate Dickie as Anna le Fevre
 Henry Ian Cusick as Willie Scott
 Matilda Thorpe as Andrea

Production
The film was financed in part by a crowdfunding campaign on the website Indiegogo, which raised US$22,660. Additional funding came through the efforts of producer Claire Mundell, who "[patch-worked] a bunch of different sources of funding together, none of whom interfered in any kind of way with the way the film turned out".

Scottish actor Emun Elliott was originally attached to play the role of Tom, but was replaced with French actor Stanley Weber. This led the filmmakers to write into the script the character's French background, as well as "a lot of explanation about how this French guy could end up in Glasgow and be a publisher".

Reception
The film received mostly negative reviews. On review aggregator website Rotten Tomatoes, the film holds an approval rating of 31% based on 16 reviews, with an average rating of 3.86/10.

Reviewing it in The Times, Wendy Ide described the film as being "so cloyingly perky and twee, you want to feed the whole film, bestselling novels and all, into a shredder."  Writing in The Guardian, Mike McCahill gave the film 1 star out of 5, calling it "lamentably close to the modern romcom average". 

In The Daily Telegraph, David Gritten was similarly unimpressed, criticising both the screenplay and Gillan's acting, concluding that "The film's ending was indeed a happy moment, but not in the intended manner." Time Out gave the film 1 star out of 5, calling it "a great advert for Glasgow, but it delivers an awful warning to filmmakers about shooting a script that's seriously unready for public consumption."

References

External links
 
 

2013 films
2013 romantic comedy films
British romantic comedy films
Scottish films
English-language Scottish films
Films set in Scotland
Films shot in Glasgow
British independent films
Films directed by John McKay
Films scored by Lorne Balfe
2013 independent films
Crowdfunded films
Films about writers
Indiegogo projects
2010s English-language films
2010s British films